Canischio is a comune (municipality) in the Metropolitan City of Turin in the Italian region Piedmont, located about  north of Turin.

Canischio borders the following municipalities: Sparone, Cuorgnè, Alpette, San Colombano Belmonte, Pratiglione, and Prascorsano. It is located in the Gallenca river valley.

References

External links
 Official website

Cities and towns in Piedmont